The End Is Near is the second studio album by The New Year, released on May 18, 2004 through Touch & Go Records. The album's recording spanned across three sessions in 2003 (June 7–11, July 11–15, and August 29–30) with the help of Steve Albini, and the album was mixed between October and November that same year at The Echo Lab. To promote the album, a music video was produced for the track "Disease".

Track listing

Personnel
Matt Kadane - guitar, vocals, production
Bubba Kadane - guitar, vocals, production, mixing
Peter Schmidt - guitar
Mike Donofrio - bass
Chris Brokaw - drums
Steve Albini - recording engineer
John Golden - mastering
Matthew Barnhart - mixing

References

External links
The New Year official website
 

2004 albums
The New Year albums
Touch and Go Records albums